Below are the squads for the 2010 AFC Challenge Cup in Sri Lanka, that took place between 16 February and 27 February 2010.  The players' listed age is their age on the tournament's opening day (16 February 2010).

Group A

Tajikistan
Coach: Pulod Kodirov

Bangladesh
Coach: Saiful Bari Titu

Myanmar
Coach: Tin Myint Aung

Sri Lanka
Coach: Mohamed Amanulla

Group B

India
Coach: Sukhvinder Singh
The AIFF sent the India U-23 team for this tournament, therefore no caps at any level are displayed.

Kyrgyzstan
Coach: Anarbek Ormonbekov

North Korea
Coach: Jo Tong-Sop

Turkmenistan
Coach: Ýazguly Hojageldiýew

References

External links
2010 AFC Challenge Cup Squads

AFC Challenge Cup squads
squads